The Southampton Boat Show, also called the Southampton International Boat Show, is an on-water boat show, one of the largest in Europe and the biggest of its type in the UK. The show is held annually in September in Mayflower Park, Southampton, England. The Southampton Boat Show is run by British Marine, the trade association for the leisure, superyacht and small commercial marine industry.

The Southampton Boat Show is an important sales platform for both national and international businesses, attracting over 110,000 visitors. The show attracts high net worth individuals from the UK and around the world, with an attendance sex ratio of 77% male, 23% female and an average age of 51 years. The average amount spent at each show is over £880 per head (excluding spending on boats).

History
The show began in 1969. Since September 1997, the Boat Show has been a ten-day event, after the passing in July of the Southampton International Boat Show Act 1997 that allows Mayflower Park to close for 10 days instead of 9. Past events have attracted a large number of visitors, with more than 123,000 attending the 2004 event. The 2005 event featured a makeshift beach, with tonnes of sand being imported to the event.

Southampton International Boat Show Act 1997

The Southampton International Boat Show Act 1997 (c. i) is an Act of the Parliament of the United Kingdom. It is a local Act. Section 1 provides the short title. Section 2 amends section 60 of the Hampshire Act 1983. The effect of the amendment made by section 2(2) is to allow Mayflower Park to close for 10 days instead of 9 during the Southampton International Boat Show.

By 2008, the Act had not received any amendment of a kind listed in the Chronological Tables.

The Bill for this Act was the Southampton International Boat Show Bill.

Exhibitors 
The exhibitors at the Boat Show cover every aspect of the leisure marine industry from boat builders, sail makers, chandlers and engine manufacturers to marine finance, clothing specialists, navigation equipment. There are thousands of boats, brands, products and suppliers for the ten day Show.

Organisers 
British Marine is the trade association for the UK boating industry. Run by the industry, for the industry, the profits from both Shows are reinvested back into the UK leisure marine industry through the services and representation provided by British Marine. British Marine has over 1,600 members, which account for a substantial amount of the industry's turnover and employ around 30,000 people. They are drawn from both the seagoing and inland sectors of the marine industry covering the leisure boat, hire fleet, commercial work boat and superyacht categories and supporting services.

References
"Southampton boat show on course for record" (1976) 56 Time & Tide 34
"The international boat show" (1984) 40 Proceedings of the Hampshire Field Club and Archaeological Society 138
Alan Tucker (ed). The Penguin Guide to England & Wales 1991. Penguin Books. 1991. p 224. Google.

External links
Official website

Tourist attractions in Southampton
Sport in Hampshire
Boat shows in the United Kingdom